Oh Long Johnson is a 2019 album by Spanish pop group Miss Caffeina.

Background
The title of the album was inspired by the famous viral video of the Oh Long Johnson cat. The album was produced by British producer, Max Dingel.

Chart performance
The album was in the Spanish charts for ten weeks, peaking at No. 1 in March 2019.

Track listing

References

2019 albums
Miss Caffeina albums